This is a list of notable architects from Croatia.

A 
 Vladoje Aksmanović
 Alfred Albini
 Andrija Aleši
 Vicko Andrić
 Ante Anin

B 
 Vjekoslav Bastl
 Nikola Bašić

D 
 Juraj Dalmatinac
 Julio Deutsch

F 
 Nikola Firentinac
 Ignjat Fischer
 Igor Franić

G
 Stjepan Gomboš

H 
 Vjekoslav Heinzel
 Leo Hönigsberg

I 
 Drago Ibler

J 
 Bruno Juričić

K 
 Franjo Klein
 Viktor Kovačić

L 
 Luciano Laurana (Lucijan Vranjanin)
 Slavko Löwy
 Aleksandar Ljahnicky

M 
 Paskoje Miličević Mihov

N 
 Juraj Neidhardt
 Velimir Neidhardt

P 
 Stjepan Planić

R 
 Božidar Rašica
 Vjenceslav Richter
 Ante Rožić

S 
 Josip Seissel

Š 
 Edo Šen
 Vladimir Šterk

T 
 Petar Trifunović

V 
 Josip Vancaš
 Ivan Vitić
 Franjo Vranjanin

Z 
 Anđeo Lovrov Zadranin
 Juraj Lovrov Zadranin
 Milan Zloković

References

 
Croatian
Architects